Cyrille Doyon (October 28, 1842 – January 7, 1918) was a Quebec merchant, farmer and political figure. He represented Laprairie in the House of Commons of Canada from 1887 to 1891 as an independent Liberal and Laprairie in the Legislative Assembly of Quebec from 1892 to 1897 as a Conservative member.

He was born in St-Isidore, Canada East, the son of Antoine Doyon and Marie-Archange Pépin dit Lachance, and was educated at the Collège de Montréal. Doyan was a justice of the peace and an inspector for the Farmers' Assurance Company and for the Sovereign Assurance Company. In 1869, he married Vitaline Riopel. Doyon served as mayor of Saint-Isidore from 1874 to 1876. He established the first butter factory in Saint-Isidore in 1885. Doyon was defeated when he ran for reelection to the House of Commons in 1891 and when he ran for reelection to the Quebec assembly in 1897. He moved to Montreal in 1898. Doyon died there at the age of 75 and was buried in the Notre-Dame-des-Neiges Cemetery.

References 

 

1842 births
1918 deaths
Members of the House of Commons of Canada from Quebec
Conservative Party of Quebec MNAs
Mayors of places in Quebec
People from Montérégie
Canadian justices of the peace
Burials at Notre Dame des Neiges Cemetery